Vesna Nikolić Vukajlović (born September 3, 1962) is a politician in Serbia. She is currently serving her second term in the National Assembly of Serbia as a member of the far-right Serbian Radical Party.

Early life and career
Nikolić Vukajlović was born in Aleksandrovac, then part of the People's Republic of Serbia in the Federal People's Republic of Yugoslavia. She holds a Bachelor of Laws degree and has operated a private business since 1999. She is now based in Kraljevo.

Political career
Nikolić Vukajlović received the 224th position on the Radical Party's electoral list in the 2007 Serbian parliamentary election. The party won eighty-one seats, and Nikolić Vukajlović was subsequently chosen as part of the party's assembly delegation. (From 2000 to 2011, Serbian parliamentary mandates were awarded to sponsoring parties or coalitions rather than to individual candidates. It was common practice for mandates to be awarded out of numerical order; Nikolić Vukajlović's low position on the list did not prevent her from receiving a mandate.) She served as an opposition member of the assembly for the next year. She received the sixtieth position on the Radical Party's list in the 2008 parliamentary election but was not selected for the party's delegation in the sitting of the assembly that followed.

Nikolić Vukajlović served as deputy mayor of Kraljevo following the 2008 local elections, when the Radicals formed a local coalition government with the Socialist Party of Serbia and others. She remained in the position until March 2009, when a new local coalition was formed by the Socialists and the For a European Serbia alliance. A report in Politika indicates that Nikolić Vukajlović resisted the transfer of power and was detained by police. She was later expelled from the municipal Radical Party in June 2010, although she was subsequently reinstated.

Serbia's electoral system was reformed in 2011, such that parliamentary mandates were awarded in numerical order to candidates on successful lists. Nikolić Vukajlović received the fifteenth position on the Radical Party's election list in the 2016 parliamentary election and was elected when the party won twenty-two mandates. She once again serves as an opposition deputy and is a member of the assembly's committee on constitutional and legal issues and the committee on labour, social issues, social inclusion, and poverty reduction. She is a member of the parliamentary friendship groups with Belarus, Greece, Kazakhstan, and Spain.

In the aftermath of the 2017 Serbian presidential election, in which the Radical Party fared poorly, Nikolić Vukajlović was reported as having been critical of the party's central campaign.

References

1962 births
Living people
People from Aleksandrovac
Politicians from Kraljevo
Members of the National Assembly (Serbia)
Serbian Radical Party politicians